The Lewis-Syford House is a historic house on the campus of the University of Nebraska–Lincoln in Lincoln, Nebraska. It was built in 1878 for Reverend Elisha M. Lewis, a Presbyterian missionary who had been a chaplain in the Union Army during the American Civil War, and designed in the Second Empire style. It was bequeathed by Constance C. Syford to the Nebraska State Historical Society in 1965. It is the oldest building on the UNL campus. It has been listed on the National Register of Historic Places since February 18, 1971.

References

National Register of Historic Places in Lincoln, Nebraska
Second Empire architecture in Nebraska
Houses completed in 1878
1878 establishments in Nebraska
University of Nebraska–Lincoln
History Nebraska